Sir Ian Roger Bauckham  (born 7 March 1962) is a British educator and public servant.

Born in Hornchurch in 1962, Bauckham was educated at Downing College, Cambridge where he read modern and mediæval languages, graduating in 1984, and then the University of Nottingham where he gained his PGCE in 1985. He subsequently took an MA in Education at the Institute of Education of the University of London in 1994, and an MA in Philosophy at Heythrop College, University of London in 1997.

Bauckham served as President of the Association of School and College Leaders for 2013–14. , Bauckham has been Headteacher of Bennett Memorial Diocesan School since 2004, the CEO of the Tenax Schools academy trust since 2015, and serves on the board of Ofqual since March 2018 and as its executive Chair since January 2021.

Bauckham was appointed a Commander of the Order of British Empire "for services to Education" in the 2017 Birthday Honours, and was knighted in the 2023 New Year Honours, with the same citation.

References

External links 

 Bauckham's entry on GOV.UK
 Biography for Bauckham at the 2022 Schools and Academy Summit

Living people
1962 births
British educators
Commanders of the Order of the British Empire
Knights Bachelor